Tomislav Karlo (born 21 December 1970 in Split, Croatia) is an  Olympic backstroke swimmer from Croatia. He swam for Croatia at the 1996 Olympics.

In the early 1990s, he attended and swam for the USA's Brigham Young University. During the second half of the 1990s he won several medals at the Short Course European Championships. In 1997 during the FINA World Cup meet in Paris, France he set a European Record in 50 m backstroke with the time 24.52.

He swam for Croatia at the following international events:
Olympics: 1996
World Championships: 1998
Short Course Worlds: 1997
Short Course Europeans: 1996, 1998, 1999, 2000

As of 2011, he is the Secretary-General of the Croatian Swimming Federation.

References

1970 births
Living people
Male backstroke swimmers
Swimmers at the 1996 Summer Olympics
Olympic swimmers of Croatia
Sportspeople from Split, Croatia
Croatian male swimmers
Croatian sports executives and administrators
20th-century Croatian people